Gavilea is a genus of flowering plants from the orchid family, Orchidaceae. It is native to Chile (including the Juan Fernández Islands), Argentina and the Falkland Islands.

Gavilea araucana (Phil.) M.N.Correa - Chile, Argentina 
Gavilea australis (Skottsb.) M.N.Correa - Falkland Islands, Tierra del Fuego
Gavilea cardioglossa (Reiche) Martic. - Chile
Gavilea gladysiae Chemisquy - Chile, Argentina 
Gavilea glandulifera (Poepp. & Endl.) M.N.Correa - Chile, Argentina 
Gavilea insularis M.N.Correa - Juan Fernández Islands
Gavilea kingii (Hook.f.) M.N.Correa - southern Chile
Gavilea litoralis (Phil.) M.N.Correa - southern Chile, southern Argentina, Falkland Islands
Gavilea longibracteata (Lindl.) Sparre ex L.E.Navas - Chile
Gavilea lutea (Comm. ex Pers.) M.N.Correa - Chile, Argentina 
Gavilea odoratissima Poepp.  - Chile, Argentina 
Gavilea platyantha (Rchb.f.) Ormerod - Chile, Argentina 
Gavilea supralabellata M.N.Correa  - Chile, Argentina 
Gavilea trullata Ormerod - Chile, Argentina 
Gavilea venosa (Lam.) Garay & Ormerod - Chile
Gavilea wittei (Hicken) Ormerod - Chile, Argentina

See also 
 List of Orchidaceae genera

References 

  (1833) Fragmentum Synopseos Plantarum Phanerogamum 18.
  (2003) Genera Orchidacearum 3: 10 ff, Oxford University Press.
  2005. Handbuch der Orchideen-Namen. Dictionary of Orchid Names. Dizionario dei nomi delle orchidee. Ulmer, Stuttgart
  (2009). Novedades nomenclaturales en el género Gavilea (Orchidaceae, Chloraeinae), con especial énfasis en las especies Chilenas. Darwiniana 47: 315–320.

External links 

Cranichideae genera
Chloraeinae